"The Chameleon" is a short story by Anton Chekhov published originally in the No. 36, 8 September 1884 issue of Oskolki magazine, subtitled "A Little Scene" (Сценка), signed A. Chekhonte (А. Чехонте). It was included (without the subtitle) into Chekhov's 1886 collection Motley Stories (Пёстрые рассказы) published in Saint Petersburg and reproduced unchanged in this book's 2–14 editions, in 1891–1899. It was included by Chekhov into Volume 2 of his Collected Works.

Synopsis
Khryukin, a drunkard, has had his finger snapped by a small dog (according to one witness, after thrusting a cigarette stub into the latter). The policeman Ochyumelov's attitude to the affair and the dog's future destiny fluctuates depending upon the coming information as to who the owner of the culprit might be.

References

External links
 Хамелеон. The original Russian text
 A Chameleon. The translation by Constance Garnett

Short stories by Anton Chekhov
1884 short stories
Works originally published in Russian magazines